Ben Birchall (born 21 January 1977) and Tom Birchall, (born 23 December 1986), from Mansfield, Nottinghamshire, are English motorcycle-with-sidecar road race World Championship-winning competitors in both F1 category (2009 and 2018 seasons) and F2 category (2016, officially known as F2 Sidecar World Trophy, using 600 engines running concurrently with 1000-engined outfits) and again in the 2017 season – when all competitors used 600 engines.

The brothers are Ten-time TT winners in 2013, 2015 (twice), 2016, 2017 (twice), 2018 (twice) and 2019 (twice). and absolute lap and race record holders set in 2018, 2017 and 2015 respectively.

During the 2017 season the reigning F2 sidecar champions campaigned in the World championship and British championship (600 Cup) as Team Mansfield with IEG Racing, using an LCR F1 outfit powered by a Yamaha R6 600 cc engine. For the 2017 Isle of Man TT races in June and the island's Southern 100 races in July they used a smaller (F2) LCR short chassis, as required by regulations, powered by a Honda 600 cc engine.

In May 2019, Ben was elected as a Mansfield District Council Councillor in the Kings Walk ward for the Mansfield Independent Forum.

Racing history
Ben Birchall started racing as a sidecar passenger in 1999, and became a driver in 2003. Tom Birchall started racing as a sidecar passenger in 2003.

2009
In 2009 they were F1 Sidecar World Champions.

2010
In 2010 a new LCR long (F2) Louis Christen chassis with Yamaha R1 engine was tested in France, before debuting in April at Pembrey for the first round of the British Championship, followed by the first round of the World Championship at Le Mans, France, held as a support race to the FIM Endurance World Championship.

The short (F2) chassis needed to comply with Isle of Man TT regulations was not ready in time to test thoroughly before the May/June event, meaning the brothers cancelled their race plans due to unproven safety and performance reasons.

Ben Birchall suffered back injuries in a practice crash at the Croatia world championship round needing skin grafts.

2011
In February 2011 the Birchalls were accoladed as Nottinghamshire County Council's Sports Team of the Year after an online public vote. The brothers were awarded the freedom of their hometown of Mansfield by then-Mayor Tony Egginton in 2011, who also awarded the accolade to Olympic multiple gold medal swimmer Rebecca Adlington in 2008.

2012
In 2012 the Birchalls joined with former World Champion sidecar racer and TT winner Klaus Klaffenböck and former passenger Adolf Hanni in a new team called Cofain Racing by Klaffi, using long (F1) and short (F2) LCR chassis with Honda engines prepared by Chris Mehew. The team was presented to the press with a photo-call at Creg-ny-Baa, a famous corner on the Isle of Man TT course.

During practice for the 2012 TT in June, they ran off the course at high speed close to Brandywell:

"It is a 120mph corner and I knew we were going to leave the road. It is straight down and I had a split second to make a decision. I decided to go off head first rather than risk rolling all the way down. I turned round and saw Tom stuck in a sheep fence." – Ben Birchall, Sidecar driver

Both brothers were airlifted to hospital suffering from severe bruising and discharged after observation. The machine was extensively damaged needing a new chassis and bodywork, but after the team's rebuild practicing was resumed and the actual races resulted in second and third places in the two-leg event.

After the two TT race legs, they immediately left for their debut at Hungaroring race track in Hungary, the second round of the FIM World Championship where they finished in fourth place after a two-part race interrupted by rain. Back on the Isle of Man, in their absence, their Spirit of TT Award was received on their behalf by father John Birchall and Klaus Klaffenbock.

They entered their first Southern 100 short-length road races in July 2012 and were the first newcomers to debut as winners of the sidecar championship, also receiving their Spirit of TT award on their return to the island.

2013
In 2013 they won their first TT race.

2014
In 2014 they experienced a TT crash near to Black Dub. Both were initially treated at Noble's hospital in Douglas town. Tom suffered a  bruised lung, cuts and severe bruising, whilst Ben had a seriously damaged right hand, being later transferred to Wigan where an orthopaedic surgeon, helped by a plastic surgeon, rebuilt his hand with metal plates and wires, successfully saving his injured little finger.

2015
In 2015, the Birchalls withdrew from F1 World Championship after the opening round at Donington Park, citing a host of reasons but mainly the dangerous driving of Tim Reeves in causing a collision that disabled the Birchalls outfit, for which he was disqualified from the race result. A lengthy public statement was issued.

2016
In August 2016, before the season's end, the brothers had already amassed a points tally to become F1 (600) champions in August running along with the F1 1000 cc competitors

2017
In 2017, the brothers again won the World Championship after the September round in Croatia, using the same 600 cc engine as all other competitors. With their two 2017 Isle of Man TT race wins, this was the first time in history of the sport that both prestigious titles were won in the same year.

2018 
The Brothers were once again crowned World Champions as the championship battle went to the final round at the German circuit of Oschersleben.  The Birchalls took the Championship win with a convincing victory.  In the same year they won both Isle of Man Sidecar TT Races to become 8 times TT winners - also taking the outright Race and Lap records and being the first ever Sidecar team to lap the TT circuit in under 19 minutes. (https://www.iomtt.com/news/2018/06/08/birchalls-smash-own-record-in-first-sub-nineteen-minute-lap)

2019 
The brothers once again contested both the World Championship and Isle of Man TT Races - 2 further TT wins took their tally to 10 wins with Tom Birchall becoming the most successful Sidecar passenger of all time and the duo becoming level in wins on the all time TT wins leader board with the Legendary Giacamo Agostini.  His 10th TT win also escalated Ben to the 2nd most successful TT Sidecar Driver of all time behind Dave Molyneux.

They took 3rd place in the World Championship having taken three 1st places throughout the season which was blighted by technical issues.

References

External links
Birchall Racing official site

English motorcycle racers
Isle of Man TT riders
Sidecar racers
Sportspeople from Mansfield
Living people
Year of birth missing (living people)